The 2022 Baylor Bears football team represented Baylor University in the 2022 NCAA Division I FBS football season. The Bears played their home games at McLane Stadium in Waco, Texas, and competed in the Big 12 Conference. They were led by third-year head coach Dave Aranda.

Previous season

The Bears began the 2021 football season unranked and were picked to finish 8th place in the Big 12 Conference. The Bears finished the regular season 3–0 in nonconference play and 7–2 in Big 12 play, with the only loses coming to No. 19 Oklahoma State on October 2, 2021, and an unranked TCU team on November 6, 2021. On November 8, Baylor's assistant head coach, Joey McGuire, was hired by Texas Tech University to replace the recently fired Matt Wells as the Red Raiders' next head football coach. As a result, McGuire departed the Baylor Bears' 2021 football staff immediately and did not finish the season with the Bears. Starting quarterback Gerry Bohanon suffered a hamstring injury on November 20, 2021, during the Kansas State football game and remained unavailable for the remaining regular season game and the 2021 Big 12 Championship Game. In the 2021 Big 12 Championship Game, the Bears relied on their redshirt Freshman backup quarterback, Blake Shapen, and defense to beat Oklahoma State 21–16 on an iconic goal line stand. After winning Baylor's 3rd Big 12 title, the Bears defeated No. 8 Ole Miss 21–7 in the 2022 Sugar Bowl. The Bears finished the 2021 football season 12–2, which reflects the most wins in Baylor Bears football history and a program record of five wins over ranked opponents in a single season.

Offseason

Position key

2022 NFL draft

Preseason

Spring game
The Bears held spring practices in March and April 2022. The Baylor football spring "Green and Gold game" took place in Waco, TX on April 23, 2022.

Big 12 media poll
The preseason poll was released on July 7, 2022.

Preseason Big-12 awards
2022 Preseason All-Big 12 teams

Source:

Preseason All-Americans

Schedule
Baylor and the Big 12 announced the 2022 football schedule on December 1, 2021.

Game summaries

vs. Albany

at No. 21 BYU

vs. Texas State

at Iowa State

vs. No. 9 Oklahoma State

at West Virginia

vs. Kansas

at Texas Tech

at Oklahoma

vs. No. 19 Kansas State

Sources: K-State Box Score

vs. No. 4 TCU (Big Noon Kickoff)

at No. 23 Texas

Sources: Stats

vs. Air Force (Armed Forces Bowl)

Personnel

Roster

Coaching staff

Rankings

References

Baylor
Baylor Bears football seasons
Baylor Bears football